metacoon is an open-source platform that can be used for online learning, cooperative work and for the creation of learning material. The system offers the functionality of a Learning Management System. The developer team also offers tools for the creation of learning and knowledge content(e.g. QTIquestions and tests or SCORM ). The software is published under the GNU General Public License. The offline authoring tools are freeware.

History

The project started in 1999 as a project for the development of learning content at the Bauhaus University in Weimar. After being used as the internal platform of the project the system was used for online courses at the university in 2002. Due to the interest of other educational organisations it was published under the GPL in 2004.
The development of the open source software is managed in Weimar, Germany.

Origin of the name
The name "metacoon" derives from the Greek word meta and the word Cocoon (the Apache framework of the same name used in the project).

Features

The platform uses a room metaphor. A metacoon platform can be imagined as a virtual house with a number of rooms for projects or courses.

The rooms can be furnished with the tools of the metacoon framework to use them in different scenarios:

 as learning environments
 as a virtual project environment
 as an alumni portal 
 as a platform for career services

Learning management
 creation of courses
 management of SCORM and QTI 2.1 packages
 implementation and management of learning material such as images, PDF, Office documents, videos, audio, HTML courses
 assignments (private, public)
 discussion forum

cooperative working / knowledge management

 group and permission management
 file management
 calendar
 polls

Interoperability

metacoon runs on any system that supports PHP 5.x and MySQL 5.x.
Tomcat and Cocoon are needed in order to use QTI packages.
metacoon offers the following interoperability features:

 authentication using LDAP and Shibboleth
 quizzes and assessments using the IMS QTI 2.1 standard
 enrollment by means of an interface for student information systems
 integration with other Content Management Systems such as the edu-sharing repository

See also
 Learning management system

References

External links
 Official website
 Demo-platform
 official documentation

Free educational software
Learning management systems
Virtual learning environments
2001 software
Formerly proprietary software